Leptolepidae (also spelt as Leptolepididae) is an extinct family of herring-like stem-teleost fish found throughout the world during the Jurassic. They were among the first fish to possess certain teleost synapomorphies, such as cycloid scales and fully ossified vertebrae.

References

Jurassic bony fish
Prehistoric ray-finned fish families
Early Jurassic first appearances
Middle Jurassic extinctions